Doxa Devtera is a Cypriot association football club based in Deftera, located in the Nicosia District. It has 5 participations in Cypriot Fourth Division.

References

Football clubs in Cyprus
Association football clubs established in 1968
1968 establishments in Cyprus